The 1999–2000 Illinois State Redbirds men's basketball team represented Illinois State University during the 1999–2000 NCAA Division I men's basketball season. The Redbirds, led by first year head coach Tom Richardson, played their home games at Redbird Arena and competed as a member of the Missouri Valley Conference.

They finished the season 10–20, 5–13 in conference play to finish in a tie for eighth place. They were the number eight seed for the Missouri Valley Conference tournament. They were defeated by Wichita State University in their opening round game.

Roster

Schedule

|-
!colspan=9 style=|Regular Season

|-
!colspan=9 style=|Diet PepsiMissouri Valley Conference {MVC} tournament

References

Illinois State Redbirds men's basketball seasons
Illinois State
Illinois State Redbirds Men's Basketball
Illinois State Redbirds Men's Basketball